Otto Wels (15 September 1873 – 16 September 1939) was a German politician who served as a member of parliament from 1912 to 1933 and as the chairman of the Social Democratic Party of Germany (SPD) from 1919 until his death in 1939. His 1933 speech in the Reichstag in opposition to Hitler and against the Enabling Act marked the end of the Weimar Republic prior to the Act passing into law.

Life and career

Born in Berlin on 15 September 1873, Wels was the son of an innkeeper (Johann Wels and his wife Johanne). The restaurant served as a meeting place for early SPD supporters exposing Wels to the workers movement at a young age. In 1891, he began an apprenticeship as a paper hanger and joined the SPD. Around 1893, he married Bertha Antonie Reske, a seamstress and they had two sons, Walter and Hugo. In the early 1890s, he represented other workers in the Berlin Craftsmens Chamber and was elected the first Chairman of the local SPD branch. From 1895 to 1897 he served his military service period in the German Army but suffered from harassment by officers due to his politics (he was not granted leave for his entire service period). On his finishing military service, he enrolled at the Workers Educational Society in Berlin for further education before attempting to return to politics. He was unsuccessful in being relected as SPD local chairman (District Five) but continued to campaign until he was elected as a representative in the new SPD party organisation in 1901. 

From 1906 he worked as a trade union official, party secretary in the Province of Brandenburg and the Vorwärts press committee. In 1912 he was elected to the Reichstag and with the support of August Bebel joined the SPD executive committee the next year. His role on the executive committee allowed him to take a central role in the development of the SPD.

In the German Revolution of 9 November 1918, Wels was a member of the Berlin workers' council (Arbeiter-und Soldatenrat) of the SPD and USPD. He was appointed military commander of the city and consequently had to deal with the occupation of the Stadtschloss by revolutionary forces including violent fights with Freikorps units. Upon the election of Friedrich Ebert as Reich President on 11 February 1919 he acted as presiding officer of the SPD and was formally elected chairman, together with Hermann Müller, on 14 June.

In 1920, Wels and Carl Legien organised the general strike that helped defeat the right-wing Kapp Putsch, after which Wels enforced the resignation of his party colleague Gustav Noske as Reich Minister of Defence. He argued for the foundation of the Reichsbanner Schwarz-Rot-Gold and the Iron Front paramilitary organisations against the rising extremist forces of the SA, Der Stahlhelm and Rotfrontkämpferbund. From 1923 Wels also became a member of the executive of the Labour and Socialist International. After the 1930 Reichstag election, Wels advocated the toleration of the cabinet of Chancellor Heinrich Brüning, who had lost the support of the DNVP deputies. Even after the Preußenschlag of July 1932 against Otto Braun's government in the Free State of Prussia, he spoke against a general strike, but after the Reichstag election of November 1932 he rejected any negotiations with the new chancellor, Kurt von Schleicher.

Enabling Act 
On 23 March 1933 Wels was the only member of the Reichstag to speak against Adolf Hitler's Enabling Act (the "Law for Removing the Distress of People and Reich"). The vote took place during the last session of the multiparty Reichstag, on 23 March 1933. Because the Reichstag building had suffered heavy fire damage in February, the March session was held in Berlin's Kroll Opera House. Despite the incipient persecution of opposition politicians and the presence of the SA, he made a courageous speech opposing the Enabling Act, which gave the Reich cabinet the right to pass laws without the consent of the Reichstag for a period of four years. The Social Democrats were inventive and resistant but eventually were overpowered by the Nazis.

Speaking directly to Hitler, Wels proclaimed,

All 94 SPD members of parliament who were present voted against the act. Using the powers of the Reichstag Fire Decree, the Nazis had detained several SPD deputies, and others had already fled into exile. The Communists had been banned and so could not vote. The rest of the Reichstag voted in favour. However, Nazi intimidation had worked so well that even if all 107 SPD deputies had been present and voted against it, the Enabling Act would have still passed with the required two-thirds majority for a constitutional amendment.

The passage of the Enabling Act marked the end of parliamentary democracy in Germany and formed the legal authority for Hitler's dictatorship. Within weeks of the passage of the Enabling Act, the Hitler government banned the SPD, and the other German political parties chose to dissolve to avoid persecution, making the Nazi Party the only legal political party in Germany.

Exile and death 
In June 1933, Wels went into exile in the Territory of the Saar Basin, which at the time was under League of Nations control. From there he moved to exile in Prague. In Prague, he established Sopade, the exile organization of the SPD. In August 1933, he was deprived of his German citizenship. 

As a result of the Munich Agreement, Wels had to leave Prague and went to Paris at the end of 1938, where he died on 16 September 1939 at the age of 66. He is buried in the Cimetière Nouveau cemetery at Châtenay-Malabry.

Legacy
In his memoirs, the former Chancellor Heinrich Brüning described Otto Wels as "Germany's bravest man in the fight against Hitler".

References

External links 

 German Resistance Memorial Center Biography
 , the speech from March 23, 1933, audio as far, as it has been preserved, supplemented by the protocol, animated with kinetic typography

1873 births
1939 deaths
Politicians from Berlin
People from the Province of Brandenburg
Social Democratic Party of Germany politicians
Members of the 13th Reichstag of the German Empire
Members of the Weimar National Assembly
Members of the Reichstag of the Weimar Republic
Reichsbanner Schwarz-Rot-Gold members
Members of the Executive of the Labour and Socialist International
Exiles from Nazi Germany